A kairomone (a coinage using the Greek καιρός opportune moment, paralleling pheromone) is a semiochemical, emitted by an organism, which mediates interspecific interactions in a way that benefits an individual of another species which receives it and harms the emitter. This "eavesdropping" is often disadvantageous to the producer (though other benefits of producing the substance may outweigh this cost, hence its persistence over evolutionary time). The kairomone improves the fitness of the recipient and in this respect differs from an allomone (which is the opposite: it benefits the producer and harms the receiver) and a synomone (which benefits both parties). The term is mostly used in the field of entomology (the study of insects). Two main ecological cues are provided by kairomones; they generally either indicate a food source for the receiver, or the presence of a predator, the latter of which is less common or at least less studied.

Predators use them to find prey
An example of this can be found in the Ponderosa Pine tree (Pinus ponderosa), which produces a terpene called myrcene when it is damaged by the Western pine beetle. Instead of deterring the insect, it acts synergistically with aggregation pheromones which in turn act to lure more beetles to the tree. 

Specialist predatory beetles find bark beetles (their prey) using the pheromones the bark beetles produce. In this case the chemical substance produced is both a pheromone (communication between bark beetles) and a kairomone (eavesdropping). This was discovered accidentally when the predatory beetles and other enemies were attracted to insect traps baited with bark beetle pheromones.

Pheromones of different kinds may be exploited as kairomones by receivers. The German wasp, Vespula germanica, is attracted to a pheromone produced by male Mediterranean fruit flies (Ceratitis capitata) when the males gather for a mating display, causing the death of some. In contrast, it is the alarm pheromone (used to communicate the presence of a threat) of an ant (Iridomyrmex purpureus) that a spider predator is attracted to.

Prey use them to adjust to predators
Some prey make use of chemicals originating from predators, using these cues as an indicator of the level of predation risk and changing their morphology if need be. Changes in morphology caused by predator presence is known as predator-induced polyphenism, and occurs across a variety of animals. For example, Daphnia cucullata show formation of "helmets" when exposed to predators or the water they have lived in. Their predators include cladocerans (such as Leptodora kindtii) and larvae of Chaoborus flavicans, a midge. They respond to these kairomones by doubling the size of their helmets, a protective structure. These changes in morphology make them safer from predators.

Mice are instinctively afraid of the smell of their natural predators, including cats and rats. This occurs even in laboratory mice that have been isolated from predators for hundreds of generations. When the chemical cues responsible for the fear response were purified from cat saliva and rat urine, two homologous protein signals were identified: Fel d 4 (Felis domesticus allergen 4), the product of the cat Mup gene, and Rat n 1 (Rattus norvegicus allergen 1), the product of the rat Mup13 gene. Mice are fearful of these major urinary proteins (Mups) even when they are made in bacteria, but mutant animals that are unable to detect the Mups show no fear of rats, demonstrating their importance in initiating fearful behaviour. It is not known exactly how Mups from different species initiate disparate behaviours, but mouse Mups and predator Mups have been shown to activate unique patterns of sensory neurons in the nose of recipient mice. This implies the mouse perceives them differently, via distinct neural circuits. The pheromone receptors responsible for Mup detection are also unknown, though they are thought be members of the V2R receptor class.

Applications
Like pheromones (communication chemicals used within a species), kairomones can be utilized as an 'attracticide' to lure a pest species to a location containing pesticide. However, they might also be used to lure desired species. Kairomones produced by the hosts of parasitic wasps have been used in an attempt to attract them and keep them around in crops where they reduce herbivory, but this could instead result in fewer attacks on the herbivous pest if the applied kairomone distracts them from finding real hosts. For example, studies have shown that kairomones are effective in attracting female African sugarcane borers to deposit eggs on dead leaf material.

Recent discoveries have highlighted that predators are attracted to the odour of co-existing predators.

Kairomones have been extensively studied, and some are in successful usage, in Florida's Anastrepha suspensa eradication zone in support of the citrus, and various other orchard industries there.

See also
Chemical ecology
Major urinary proteins
Polyphenism
Push–pull technology

References

Weber A. 1999. The importance of info chemicals and clone-specific phenotypic plasticity in Daphnia ecology. PhD thesis University of Utrecht, The Netherlands. .

Chemical ecology
Insect ecology
Phytochemicals
Semiochemicals